Hoplinus is a genus of stilt bugs in the family Berytidae. There are about six described species in Hoplinus.

Species
These six species belong to the genus Hoplinus:
 Hoplinus echinatus (Uhler, 1893)
 Hoplinus paulai Henry, 2002
 Hoplinus scutellaris Henry, 1997
 Hoplinus spinosissimus (Signoret, 1863)
 Hoplinus strigosus Henry, 1997
 Hoplinus wygodzinskyi (Stusak, 1968)

References

Further reading

 
 
 

Berytidae
Articles created by Qbugbot